Harry Brooks  (September 20, 1895 – June 22, 1970) was an American writer of popular songs, jazz pianist and composer in the 1920s to the early 1950s.

Brooks was born in Homestead, Pennsylvania. After graduating from his hometown high school in 1914, he worked as a pianist with Pittsburgh bands (dance orchestras) and then as a staff composer for a publishing company. He is recalled mostly in the 21st century for his work with his friends Thomas "Fats" Waller and the lyricist Andy Razaf. Brooks was the composer of several hit songs including his composition "Ain't Misbehavin'", written with Waller and Razaf.

Also with Razaf and Waller, Brooks scored the Broadway shows Snapshots of 1921 and Connie's Hot Chocolates. He died, aged 74, in Teaneck, New Jersey.

Published songs and music 
All co-composed with Razaf and Waller unless otherwise marked
 "Ain't Misbehavin'"
"Black and Blue"
"Can't We Get Together"
"Garden Of God" - sole composer
"In the Meantime"
"Jungle Jamboree"
"Low Tide Down In My Heart" - with Andy Razaf
"My Man Is Good For Nothin' But Love"
"On the Loose" - sole composer
"Rockin' In a Rockin' Chair"
"Saturday"
"Southern Sunset" (aka "When the Sun Sets Down South") - with Sidney Joseph Bechet and Noble Sissle
"Strictly From Dixie"
"Sweet Savannah Sue"
"Swing, Mr. Charlie" - with Irving Taylor and J. Russell Robinson
"That Rhythm Man"

Notes and references

Further reading
Singer, Barry  (1992) Black And Blue: The Life And Lyrics Of Andy Razaf Schirmer Books, New York, 

1895 births
1970 deaths
20th-century American male musicians
20th-century American pianists
American jazz pianists
American male jazz musicians
American male pianists
Broadway composers and lyricists
Jazz musicians from Pennsylvania
Jazz songwriters
Musicians from Pittsburgh
People from Homestead, Pennsylvania
Songwriters from Pennsylvania
Vaudeville performers
American male songwriters